Jenny Hagel is an American comedian and comedy writer. She is currently a writer and performer for Late Night with Seth Meyers, where she is known for performing on the recurring segment "Jokes Seth Can't Tell", along with host Seth Meyers and fellow writer-performer Amber Ruffin. Hagel also serves as an Executive Producer and Head Writer on The Amber Ruffin Show on Peacock. In 2022, Hagel and Amber Ruffin co-founded their production company Straight to Cards  under their overall deal with Universal Television.

Career
Hagel graduated from College of William and Mary. She next received a MFA in Writing for the Screen and Stage from the Northwestern University School of Communication in 2009, where she was taught by David E. Tolchinsky. She performed improv and sketch comedy at The Second City in Chicago for five years before moving to New York City. In addition to Late Night with Seth Meyers, she has written for multiple other comedy TV shows, including Impractical Jokers, the Big Gay Sketch Show, and the MTV show 10 on Top, for which she was formerly the head writer. In 2020, she became the inaugural head writer for The Amber Ruffin Show on Peacock. In year 2022 she was nominated for a GLAAD Award for her work addressing LGBTQ issues on Late Night.

Personal life
Hagel is the daughter of Virginia and Judge Lawrence B. Hagel. She describes her passion for being a comedian being inherited from her parents and grandparents, as she was raised in a family where they were always telling jokes and funny stories. And because Jenny lived in an area where the entertainment business wasn’t a big deal, she did not make being a comedian her career until she moved out of Northern Virginia suburbs.

Hagel is of Puerto Rican descent. She currently lives in Brooklyn with her spouse and their son. Despite the Catholic church's anti-homosexuality stance, Hagel is Catholic.

Filmography 

 2008: Human Potential (Short) – Writer, Actress 
 2008: Crafty (Short) – Writer, Actress 
 2009: Tech Support (Short) – Writer, Actress
 2010: Feminist Rapper (Short) – Director, Writer, Actress 
 2010: The Big Gay Sketch Show (TV Series) – Writer (1 Episode)
 2010: Positive Comment (Short) – Director, Writer, Actress 
 2010: 10 on Top (TV Series) – Writer (3 Episodes)
 2010: Nice Shirt (Short) – Writer, Producer, Actress
 2013: Impractical Jokers (TV Series) – Comedy Producer
 2016–present: Late Night with Seth Meyers (TV Series) – written by (175+ episodes), Performer
 2018: White Guy Talk Show (TV Series) – Writer (39 Episodes)
 2018: 75th Golden Globe Awards (TV Special) – Writer
 2019: 76th Golden Globe Awards (TV Special) – Writer
 2020: Peacock Presents: The At-Home Variety Show Featuring Seth MacFarlane (TV Series Short) – Written by (2 Episodes)
 2020: The Amber Ruffin Show - Head Writer

References

External links

Year of birth missing (living people)
Living people
American comedy writers
American stand-up comedians
American women comedians
American LGBT comedians
LGBT Hispanic and Latino American people
Late Night with Seth Meyers
NBC employees
Northwestern University School of Communication alumni
Puerto Rican comedians
Lesbian entertainers
Lesbian writers